I/O System may refer to:

DOS BIOS (Basic Input/Output System), a low-level component in DOS operating systems, including PC DOS and DR-DOS
I/O System (86-DOS), the DOS-BIOS specifically in 86-DOS
I/O System (MS-DOS), the DOS-BIOS specifically in MS-DOS

See also 
BIOS, Basic Input/Output System
XIOS, Extended Input/Output System
CP/M BIOS, the BIOS in the CP/M family of operating systems
BIOS (disambiguation)
IOS (disambiguation)
IOCS, Input/Output Control System